Silvopasture (silva is forest in Latin) is the practice of integrating trees, forage, and the grazing of domesticated animals in a mutually beneficial way. It utilizes the principles of managed grazing, and it is one of several distinct forms of agroforestry.

Properly managed silvopasture (grazed woodland) can increase overall productivity and long-term income due to the simultaneous production of tree crops, forage, and livestock, and can provide environmental benefits such as carbon sequestration. Silvopasture is one of the oldest known forms of agriculture, and has been practiced in many parts of the world for centuries. Silvopasture is not the same as unmanaged grazing in woodlands, which has many known negative environmental consequences.

Benefits 
Open pasture systems are a result of mass deforestation, generating the loss of carbon storage, decreasing water availability, and increasing soil nutrients to a point that is damaging both to the ecosystem and to humans.  A primary benefit of silvopasture is increased farmland utilization - silvopasture can incorporate unused woodlands into production and produce multiple products on the same acreage. This diversifies farm income sources and increases farm viability. Silvopasture has been found to increase wildlife abundance and diversity and to contribute to carbon sequestration and climate change mitigation.

Livestock 
Trees in silvopasture systems provide livestock with protection from sun and wind, which can increase animal comfort and improve production. Trees can provide shade in the summer and windbreaks in the winter, allowing livestock to moderate their own temperature.  Heat stress in livestock has been associated with decreased feed intake, increased water intake, and negative effects on production, reproductive health, milk yields, fitness, and longevity.

Certain tree types can also serve as fodder for livestock. Trees may produce fruit or nuts that can be eaten by livestock while still on the tree or after they have fallen. The leaves of trees may serve as forage as well, and silvopasture managers can utilize trees as forage by felling the tree so that it can be eaten by livestock, or by using coppicing or pollarding to encourage leaf growth where it is accessible to livestock.

Forage 
Well-managed silvopasture systems can produce as much forage as open-pasture systems under favorable circumstances. Silvopasture systems have also been observed to produce forage of higher nutritive quality than non-silvopasture forage under certain conditions. Increased forage availability has been observed in silvopasture systems compared to open-pasture systems under drought conditions, where the combination of shade from trees and water uptake from tree roots may reduce drought impacts.

Trees 
Silvopasture is compatible with fruit, nut, and timber production. Grazing can serve as a cost-effective vegetation and weed control method. Silvopasture can also help reduce pests and disease in orchards - when introduced into an orchard after harvest, livestock are able to consume unharvested fruits, preventing pests and diseases from spreading via these unharvested fruits and in some cases consuming the pests themselves.

Methods 
Silvopasture can be established by planting trees into existing pasture or by establishing pasture in existing woodland. The two methods differ significantly in the challenges they present.

Integrating trees into pasture 
Planting trees into existing pasture presents several challenges: young trees must be protected from livestock, trees may take years to become productive (depending on the species), and planting trees in a pasture can limit the ability to use that land for other purposes in the future.

Integrating pasture into woodland 
Integrating pasture into existing woodland presents challenges as well: the woodland likely needs to be thinned to increase light infiltration, which is time consuming and may require heavy machinery, as well as a strategy for dealing with felled trees. Thinned woodlands are also likely to experience a flush of growth in weeds and seedling trees that must be dealt with to prevent the pasture from being overgrown. Pasture forages may also need to be established beneath the trees, a process which can be difficult if trees have already been felled.

History 
 According to the wood-pasture hypothesis, open, grazed woodlands of some form or another would have been part of the original European wildwoods even before they were used by humans. Fruit and nut and silvopasture systems covered large portions of central Europe until the 20th century, and are still-widespread in some areas. Wood pasture, one of the oldest land-use practices in human history, is a historical European land management system in which open woodland provided shelter and forage for grazing animals, particularly sheep and cattle, as well as woodland products such as timber for construction and fuel, coppiced stems for wattle and charcoal making and pollarded poles. Since Roman times, pigs have been released into beech and oak woodlands to feed on the acorn and beech mast, and into fruit orchards to eat fallen fruit.

United Kingdom 

Tree species and planting densities are studied over a range of sites at The Silvopastoral National Network Experiment. Natural England's Environmental Stewardship scheme defines Wood Pasture, in the Farm Environmental Plan booklet, as a structure of open grown or high-forest in a matrix of grazed-grassland, heathland, and/or woodland floras.

Their experience shows sheep use the trees for shelter from wind. This could provide significant animal-welfare benefits. However, 'sheep time' close to trees results in soil compaction  with the greatest-compaction after trees are planted at very-low densities. Some botanists recommend trees be planted at no-less than 400 per hectare to ensure good-establishment.

Evidence of old wood-pasture management is detectable in many of the ancient woodlands of Scotland, such as Rassal Ashwood in Ross-shire, and at Glen Finglas in the Trossachs. The Dalkeith Old Wood, belonging to the Duke of Buccleuch, cattle grazing beneath ancient oak, is designated as a Site of Special Scientific Interest (SSSI)   (or 'ASSI').

Epping Forest is one of the principal remnants of wood pasture in England. Here, the grazing of cattle was combined with the pollarding of trees for fuel, both for domestic consumption and for sale. This system continued in the parish of Loughton until banned in 1879. The town's public hall, built with compensation money for the ending of the custom, is called the Lopping Hall in memory of the practice. Controlled cattle grazing and limited pollarding is still carried out by the conservators.

United States 
Silvopastures are the most-viable and prominent agroforestry practice in the United States. In the south eastern USA, longleaf pine/wiregrass restoration projects have trialled the effects on both economics and ecology of grazing cattle among the trees. This fire-resistant tree species originally grew at low density so that understory plants were available to browsing animals. The region was used as silvopastures by Spanish settlers from the sixteenth century and this use continued into the early twentieth century, along with felling trees for timber. By the 1920s, most of the longleaf pine which once dominated around 92 million acres (about 37 million hectares) of ground between the states of Texas and Virginia had been cut down by European settlers. Removal of the trees, and loss of their associated ecosystem, led to significant soil erosion as well as replacement with dense commercial tree plantations and open agricultural fields. There has been continuing interest in silvopastures in the residual longleaf pine forests and land restoration projects, with evidence that the multiple income streams of timber and cattle are economically advantageous, along with wildlife restoration benefits. The legal protection of some species (e.g. red-cockaded woodpecker) that can be found in this habitat means that landowners may be able to add financial compensation as a further source of income.

See also
Carbon farming
Browsing (herbivory)
Dehesa
Field
Meadow
Transhumance
Forest farming

References

Further reading
Venator, Charles R., Jurgen Glaeser and Reynaldo Soto. 1992. "A Silvopastoral Strategy" in Development or Destruction: The Conversion of Tropical Forest to Pasture in Latin America. pp. 281–292. Westview Press/Boulder

External links

 National Agroforestry Center (USDA)
 Farm Woodland Forum - Silvopastoral Agroforestry
 
Silvopasture by Project Regeneration.

Agroforestry
Sustainable agriculture
Livestock
Forestry